Freddy's Nightmares is an American horror anthology television series, which aired in syndication from October 1988 until March 1990. A spin-off from the A Nightmare on Elm Street film series, each episode is introduced by Freddy Krueger (played, as in the films, by Robert Englund), and features two different stories, with eight of them throughout the series actually having Freddy Krueger as the main antagonist. The pilot episode was directed by Tobe Hooper, and begins with Krueger's prosecution on child-murdering charges.

The series was produced by New Line Television, producers of the film series, and Stone Television. It was originally distributed by Lorimar-Telepictures. Afterwards, Warner Bros. Television would assume syndication rights after acquiring Lorimar-Telepictures in 1989.

Premise
Due to the murderous basis of Freddy Krueger, New Line Cinema opted not to develop a television series with a regular batch of characters to mix it up with Krueger on a continuous basis; deeming it futile, since he would inevitably kill most of them, and there would be no one left.  Instead the producers created an anthology series, employing a new crop of actors to be used for each episode.

Each episode tells a different story of a dark rooted and/or grim nature that takes place in the fictitious town of Springwood, Ohio, and in particular, on Elm Street; the same setting as the A Nightmare on Elm Street films. Though the Freddy Krueger character occasionally plays a part in the plot, most of the stories do not involve him (it is, however, often hinted that Krueger indirectly influenced the desolate nature of the plotlines).

Similar to the Crypt Keeper in Tales from the Crypt, Krueger's primary function is to host the series. He is featured in regular bumper segments, where he offers an ominous or slapstick reaction to the happenings of the episode—culminating in him giving a quick, and usually eerie, epilogue at the end.

One element that made the series unique is its two-tier story approach. Most of the episodes feature two different stories that each take up the first and second halves. Every second story, however, usually built on a character who played a minor (or supporting) role in the first.

Several episodes throughout the second season form mini-arcs, with the events of one episode being followed up and/or referenced in a later episode. Examples of this include the episode "Interior Loft", which was given a direct sequel, "Interior Loft-Later" and "Lucky Stiff", which was followed up with "Easy Come, Easy Go".

Torrance High School was used as the filming location for Springwood High School, predating its use in later horror series like Buffy the Vampire Slayer.

Cast
The only actor from the film series retained for the TV series was Robert Englund, as Freddy Krueger.

Some of the featured actors who went on to later become notable were:

 Rosalind Allen
 Robin Antin
 Shiri Appleby
 Sarah Buxton
 Bill Camp
 Kyle Chandler
 Morris Chestnut
 Clifton Collins Jr.
 Raymond Cruz
 Richard Eden
 Mariska Hargitay
 Penny Johnson Jerald
 Eva LaRue
 Phill Lewis
 John Cameron Mitchell
 Bill Moseley
 Yvette Nipar
 Lori Petty
 Brad Pitt
 Tim Russ
 Richard Speight Jr.
 Glynn Turman

Other notable guest stars featured in the series were:

 Marc Alaimo
 Sandahl Bergman
 Timothy Bottoms
 Jeffrey Combs
 Jeff Conaway
 Mary Crosby
 Burr DeBenning
 Ellen Albertini Dow
 Tony Dow
 Diane Franklin
 Richard Gautier
 Tamara Glynn
 Bob Goen
 Wings Hauser
 Tiffany Helm
 Mark Herrier
 Joyce Hyser
 Jill Jacobson
 David Lander
 George Lazenby
 Lar Park Lincoln
 Dick Miller
 Susan Oliver
 Philip Proctor
 Paul Regina
 Jay Thomas
 Tracey Walter
 Jill Whitlow
 Glen Vernon

Episodes

With the exception of the pilot, and S1e7 "Sister's Keeper", all of the episodes carried two separate storylines. The first half hour would be devoted to one story, while the last half hour would be devoted to a second storyline.

Series overview

Home media

VHS
In the US, five VHS tapes were released by Warner Home Video in September 1991. Each tape featured one episode. The episodes released were:
 "No More Mr. Nice Guy"
 "Lucky Stiff"
 "It's My Party and You'll Die If I Want You To"
 "Dreams That Kill"
 "Freddy's Tricks and Treats"

In the UK, eight VHS tapes were released by Braveworld Ltd., originally in 1989 as rental-only tapes and then again in 1993 to the sell-through market. Each tape features two episodes.
The tapes released were:
 The Nightmare Begins Again: "No More Mr. Nice Guy" and "Killer Instinct"
 Freddy's Nightmares 2: "Sister's Keeper" and "Freddy's Tricks and Treats"
 Rock Me, Freddy: "Judy Miller, Come on Down" and "The Bride Wore Red"
 Saturday Nightmare Fever: "The End Of The World" and "Saturday Night Special"
 Do Dreams Bleed?: "Do Dreams Bleed" and "Rebel Without a Car"
 Freddy's Mother's Day: "Mother's Day" and "Black Tickets"
 Safe Sex: "Safe Sex" and "Deadline"
 It's a Miserable Life: "It's a Miserable Life" and "Love Stinks"

In Germany, eight VHS tapes were released by Virgin Video, originally in 1989 as rental-only tapes. Eacht tape features two episodes.
 Freddy - Wie alles begann: "No More Mr. Nice Guy" and "Killer Instinct"
 Schere, Tupfer, Kralle...: "Freddy's Tricks and Treats" and "It's a Miserable Life"
 Saturday Nightmare Fever: "Saturday Night Special" and "Judy Miller, Come On Down"
 Freddy's Muttertag: "Sister's Keeper" and "Mother's Day"
 Rock me Freddy: "Rebel Without a Car" and "The Bride Wore Red"
 Blutige Träume: "Do Dreams Bleed" and "Out To Lunch" aka "The End Of The World"
 Freddy's Killerinstinkt: "Deadline" and "Black Tickets"
 Freddy's Höhenkoller: "School Daze" and "Cabin Fever"

DVD & Blu-ray
In 2003, Volume 1 (the first 3 episodes) was released on Region 2 DVD in Ireland and the UK, by Warner Home Video. Volume 2 and Volume 3 was also planned to be released later in future years to come, however, Warner canceled the releases due to poor sales.

In 2011, a Blu-ray collection of the original seven A Nightmare on Elm Street films was released in the US. The set included a DVD with special features, which included two episodes of the show ("It's a Miserable Life" and "Killer Instinct").

In 2022, all episodes translated into German were published in Germany by Pidax.

Syndication
Initially the series aired in syndication across the United States.

The violent and sexual content of the series often meant that episodes were heavily edited before airing. An example of this is the series finale Safe Sex, which had 8 minutes of its more explicit footage deleted.

In 2006, AOL teamed up with distributor Warner Bros. Television to bring Freddy's Nightmares to its new In2TV broadband service.

NBCUniversal's horror and suspense-themed cable channel Chiller previously aired Freddy's Nightmares with marathons once a month. Season one and two were shown one after another, with commercial breaks, however, the channel ended the run on March 31, 2011.

In the UK, Sky and Virgin Media customers could watch the entire first series, one episode per night, at 8pm on Zone Horror, starting June 8, 2009.

In Sweden, TV4 Guld aired the show every week from 2010 to 2012.

El Rey Network has been airing the series since November 3, 2015.

As of February 15, 2022, the series is available on Screambox, a streaming service dedicated to horror content.

As of May 1, 2022, the series is now streaming on Tubi, an ad-supported free content platform owned by Fox Corporation.

Reception
Mark Pellegrini of the Adventures in Poor Taste gave the show overall rating of 6 out of 10. In a review he explains his reasons for it as that only 8 out of 44 episodes are about Freddy Krueger. Out of those 8 episodes the "Photo Finish" received the best score, while the "Safe Sex" was booted out as the worst. "No More Mr. Nice Guy" episode was greeted with a homage to the first five Nightmare on Elm Street films, while the scene where Freddy gets burned alive was shown later in Freddy vs. Jason and Freddy's Dead: The Final Nightmare.

Legacy
The genesis of the series and its impact were later revisited in the 2010 documentary Never Sleep Again: The Elm Street Legacy, which features interviews with a number of the show's writers, directors and other parties involved like original Elm Street director Wes Craven and New Line producer Bob Shaye. The Blu-ray release of the documentary includes outtakes from the series as well as footage that was deleted due to it being too graphic for television.

Notes

References

External links
 

1988 American television series debuts
1990 American television series endings
1980s American horror television series
1990s American horror television series
1980s American anthology television series
Television shows set in Ohio
American horror fiction television series
English-language television shows
First-run syndicated television programs in the United States
Television series by Warner Bros. Television Studios
Live action television shows based on films
A Nightmare on Elm Street (franchise) mass media
Television series by New Line Television
Television series by Stone Stanley Entertainment
Horror anthologies
Television shows about nightmares
1990s American anthology television series
Television series by Lorimar-Telepictures